Spiderwood Studios is a motion picture, television, music and animation studio that opened in 2009 by producer Tommy G. Warren. Located east of downtown Austin, Texas, it is situated on 164 acres of back lot alongside the Colorado River, and is the state’s largest privately owned studio.

Studio facilities
Spiderwood Studios facilities includes sound stages as well as fully equipped production offices and suites, make-up rooms, a film vault and a R.V. park with full hook-ups. The facilities are capable of housing various sets that can be redressed. Spiderwood Studios produces feature films, television, animation, music recording as well as national and international commercials.

Spiderwood Studios is home to a 24-foot-high, 100-foot-wide, one-of-a-kind Cyclorama Wall  designed by Visual Effects Director Chuck Schuman (Avatar, Lord of the Rings Trilogy) and Tommy G. Warren. The stage is most often used for visual effects and wire stunts, and is equipped with a steel cat walk. It also has the capabilities to create artificial snow or rain,  and has visual effect capabilities.  In addition, the facilities have a kitchen, dining room, several conference rooms, its own control room, edit bays, ADR/Isolation rooms, and storage.

Spiderwood Magic, LLC
Spiderwood Animation will be combining with "Spiderwood Magic" along with Spiderwood Media, these entities are in development now and plans are being made to produce films and videos that brings  "Storyworld of Creative Imagination to Life"... "Flight of Magic," the first 3 act animation short film 100% produced in Texas. Written, Directed and Produced at Spiderwood with an all Texas cast and crew...  A new office facility is being renovated and built to accommodate this new entity of the Spiderwood Brand!

Back lot

Spiderwood Studios has the only groomed-for-production back lot in Texas. The back lot offers a historic pioneer cabin that was built in the 1840s, as well as a modern-day cabin constructed with flyaway walls, that is set along the Colorado River frontage. There is also small boat docking available on the creek, behind the cabin.  The back lot also offers Spanish moss-covered trees, old and new trees and vegetation, open pastures, rolling hills as well as native wild flowers.  Trails of gravel and dirt roads travel along groomed-for-production old and new forests. All kinds of Production shooting with all types of "locations sets", including set locations for Music Videos such as the production and shoot of "Animal" by the band "Disturbed"...

Awards

The Flight of Magic (3D)	
2012   Indie Fest, Award of Merit for Original Song "Believe"
2012   California International Animation Festival, Winner, Audience Favorite
2012   Park City Film Music Festival, Finalist for Original Music from the film "Flight of Magic"
2012   Newport Beach Film Festival, Official Selection
2012   The 33rd Annual Telly Award, Silver Award, Non-Broadcast Productions for Use of Animation
2012   The 33rd Annual Telly Award, Bronze Award, Non-Broadcast Productions for Children's Audience
2011	The Accolade Competition, Award of Excellence in Animation		   
2011	The Prestige Film Award, Gold Award for Short Film/Video		   
2011	The Prestige Film Award, Gold Award for Holiday Film		   
2011	The Prestige Film Award, Silver Award for Animation		   
2011	The Prestige Film Award, Bronze Award for Original Song "Believe"

Darker Than Night 	
2014   The Accolade Competition, Award of Excellence for Movie Trailer
2014   The Accolade Competition, Award of Merit for Special Effects, non-animation/stunts
2014   The Accolade Competition, Award of Merit for Lighting
2014   IndieFest, Award won for Visiual Effects and Lighting
2014   IndieFest, Award of Excellence

Credits 
Miscellaneous Company - filmography
Templar: Honor Among Thieves (2014) ... Studio Sound Stage
Doonby (2011) ... Musical Recording Studio & Special Effects Company
"The Lying Game" (2011) School Set
The Ascent (2010) ... Studio Back-lot
Wilderness (2010/I) ... Studio Back-lot
The Overbrook Brothers (2009) ... Studio Back-lot
Teed Off Too (2006) (V) ... In Association With
Teed Off (2005) (V) ... In Association With
Hip Hop Get Down (2003) (V) ... In Association With

Production Company - filmography
Bad Kids Go to Hell (2012) ... Production Company (in co-production with)
Blaze Foley: Duct Tape Messiah (2011) ... Production Company (produced in association with)
It's in the Blood (2012)... Production Company (in association with)
Flight of Magic (2011) ... Production Company (3-D animation)
Something's Gonna Live (2010) ... Production Company (produced in association with)
Teed Off: Behind the Tees (2005) (V) ... Production Company (in association)

Music Videos
Disturbed- "The Animal" (2010)… Studio Back-lot
Steve Miller Band- "I Got Love If You Want It" (2011)… Stage B

References

External links
http://spiderwoodstudios.com/	Website: SpiderwoodStudios969.com  
http://www.spiderwoodproductions.com/	
http://www.spiderwoodanimation.com/	
https://www.facebook.com/pages/Spiderwood-Studios/
https://twitter.com/Spiderwood
http://www.myspace.com/spiderwoodstudios
http://www.linkedin.com/in/spiderwood
http://www.imdb.com/company/co0194100/	
https://www.youtube.com/spiderwoodstudios
 imdb.me/tommygwarren

American film studios
Buildings and structures in Austin, Texas